Sir John Seton of Garleton (29 September 1639 – 1686) was a younger son of George Seton, 3rd Earl of Winton (died 1650), by his spouse Elizabeth, daughter of John Maxwell, 7th Lord Herries of Terrigles.

He was created a baronet of Nova Scotia by King Charles II in 1664, and married Isabel or Christian Home, daughter of John Home of Renton, by whom he had several children, including his successor Sir George Seton, 2nd Baronet, of Garleton, and Athelstanford, East Lothian.

His home was Garleton Castle.

This family became Jacobites and engaged in the 1715 Jacobite rising.

He died in 1686 and was buried at Athelstanford.

Family
The children of John Seton of Garleton and Christian Home included:
George Seton of Garleton
Margaret Seton, educated in a French nunnery, who died in Paris.

References

 The Extinct & Dormant Baronetcies of England, Ireland, and Scotland, by Messrs. John and John Bernard Burke, 2nd edition, London, 1841, p. 635.

17th-century Scottish people
1639 births
1686 deaths
Baronets in the Baronetage of Nova Scotia
Younger sons of earls
John